Acta General de Chile is a 1986 documentary film about the Pinochet dictatorship directed by Miguel Littín whose production was described by Gabriel García Marquez in Clandestine in Chile.

References

External links

1986 films
Chilean documentary films
Films about the Chilean military dictatorship
1980s Spanish-language films